Heavy!!! is an album by American jazz saxophonist Booker Ervin featuring performances recorded in 1966 for the Prestige label.

Reception
The Allmusic review by Scott Yanow awarded the album 4 stars and stated "The set matches Ervin with a remarkable rhythm section... The music is quite moody, soulful, and explorative yet not forbidding".

Track listing
 "Bächafillen" (Garnett Brown) - 8:15 
 "You Don't Know What Love Is (Don Raye, Gene de Paul) - 8:43
 "Aluminum Baby" (Jaki Byard) - 5:00 
 "Not Quite That" (Brown) - 7:54 
 "Bei Mir Bist du Schoen" (Sholom Secunda, Jacob Jacobs, Sammy Cahn, Saul Chaplin) - 12:28 
 "Ode to Charlie Parker" (Byard) - 3:57 Bonus track on CD reissue

Personnel
Booker Ervin - tenor saxophone 
Jimmy Owens - trumpet (3,4,5,6), flugelhorn (1)
Garnett Brown - trombone (1,3,4,5,6)
Jaki Byard - piano
Richard Davis - bass
Alan Dawson - drums

References 

Prestige Records albums
Booker Ervin albums
1967 albums
Albums produced by Don Schlitten